Value Added Tax (VAT) is an indirect tax levied on the value creation or addition. The concept of VAT in Nepal was introduced on 16 Nov. 1997 but the act was developed in 1998. VAT was implemented in FA 1998/99 and is the major source of government revenue. It is administered by the Inland Revenue Department of Nepal.

VAT Rates in Nepal
The normal VAT rate is 13%; some goods or services are exempted from VAT.

References

Nepal
Taxation in Nepal
1998 in Nepal
1998 establishments in Nepal